The 1975 U.S. Pro Indoor was a men's WCT tennis tournament played on indoor carpet courts at the Spectrum in Philadelphia, Pennsylvania in the United States. It was the eight edition of the tournament and was held from on January 20 through January 26, 1975. Seventh-seeded Marty Riessen won the singles title.

Finals

Singles

 Marty Riessen defeated  Vitas Gerulaitis 7–6(7–1), 5–7, 6–2, 6–7(0–7), 6–3 
 It was Riessen's only title of the year and the 41st of his career.

Doubles

 Brian Gottfried /  Raúl Ramírez defeated  Dick Stockton /  Erik van Dillen 3–6, 6–3, 7–6(7–4) 
 It was Gottfried's 1st title of the year and the 9th of his career. It was Ramirez's 2nd title of the year and the 12th of his career.

References

External links
 ITF tournament edition details

U.S. Pro Indoor
U.S. Pro Indoor
U.S. Professional Indoor
U.S. Professional Indoor
U.S. Professional Indoor